Barton S. "Bart" LeBon is a member of the Alaska House of Representatives and retired banker. He defeated Democrat Kathryn Dodge in the 2018 Alaska elections by a margin of only one vote.

References

1950s births
Alaska Nanooks men's basketball players
American bankers
Living people
Republican Party members of the Alaska House of Representatives
People from Fairbanks, Alaska
Year of birth missing (living people)
21st-century American politicians